Scott O'Brien (born June 25, 1957) is an American football coach and former player who is currently serving as an area scout for the New England Patriots of the National Football League (NFL). A former defensive end/linebacker, O'Brien served as a special teams coach for three college football teams and for five NFL franchises during a 35-year long coaching career. In 2015, O'Brien retired from coaching and began his current role as an area scout.

Playing career
O'Brien attended the University of Wisconsin–Superior where he played linebacker from 1975 through 1978. He signed with the Green Bay Packers in 1979 as a defensive end and also played in the Canadian Football League for the Toronto Argonauts in 1980.

Coaching career

College
O'Brien began his coaching career with his alma mater, Wisconsin–Superior, as an assistant coach from 1980 through 1982. In 1983, he moved to the University of Nevada, Las Vegas, where he served as UNLV's linebackers and special teams coach from 1983 through 1985. He then spent a season in the same capacity at Rice University before becoming the University of Pittsburgh's special teams coach in 1987. He held that position through 1990, when he moved to the NFL coaching ranks.

NFL
In 1991, O'Brien was hired by then-Cleveland Browns head coach Bill Belichick as the Browns' special teams coach, winning the NFL Special Teams Coach of the Year Award in 1994. He stayed with the franchise even after Belichick's departure and the team's move to Baltimore as the Baltimore Ravens following the 1995 season. O'Brien was the Ravens' special teams coach through the 1998 season before he joined the Carolina Panthers as their assistant head coach and special teams coach in 1999. He left the Panthers after the 2004 season to join then-Miami Dolphins head coach Nick Saban as Saban's coordinator of football operations and assistant to the head coach in Saban's two seasons in Miami in the 2005-06 and 2006-07 seasons. O'Brien then joined the Denver Broncos as their special teams coach in 2007, leaving after the 2008 season to serve the New England Patriots in the same capacity, re-joining Belichick.

On February 3, 2015, two days after O'Brien's special teams unit helped the New England Patriots win Super Bowl XLIX, the Patriots announced that O'Brien would retire from coaching after 24 seasons in the NFL. However, O'Brien was kept on Belichick's staff, moving to the scouting department in his new role as an area scout for the club. O'Brien was a member of the staff when the Patriots defeated the Atlanta Falcons in Super Bowl LI. O'Brien earned his third Super Bowl title when the Patriots defeated the Los Angeles Rams in Super Bowl LIII.

References

External links
New England Patriots bio
University of Wisconsin–Superior alumni bio

1957 births
Living people
American football linebackers
American football defensive ends
Toronto Argonauts players
UNLV Rebels football coaches
Rice Owls football coaches
Pittsburgh Panthers football coaches
Cleveland Browns coaches
Baltimore Ravens coaches
Carolina Panthers coaches
Miami Dolphins coaches
Denver Broncos coaches
New England Patriots coaches
New England Patriots scouts
Sportspeople from Superior, Wisconsin
Players of American football from Wisconsin
Wisconsin–Superior Yellowjackets football coaches
Wisconsin–Superior Yellowjackets football players
Green Bay Packers players